Nalanda Assembly constituency is one of 243  constituencies of legislative assembly of Bihar. It is a part of Nalanda Lok Sabha constituency along with other assembly constituencies viz. Rajgir, Harnaut, Islampur, Hilsa, Asthawan and Bihar Sharif.

Overview
Nalanda comprises CD Blocks Noorsarai & Ben; Gram Panchayats Nirpur, Bargaon & Surajpur of Silao CD Block; Gram Panchayats Biyavani, Maghrconstituenciesa, Dumrawan, Pachauri, Ranabigha & Meghi Nagwan of Bihar CD Block; Gram Panchayats Barnausa, Meyar, Bhui, Pilkhi, Goraur, Nahub,
Pathraura & Lodipur of Rajgir CD Block.

Members of Legislative Assembly

Election results

2020

2015

2010

See also
 List of Assembly constituencies of Bihar

Sources
Bihar Assembly Election Results in 1951
Bihar Assembly Election Results in 1957
Bihar Assembly Election Results in 1962
Bihar Assembly Election Results in 1967
Bihar Assembly Election Results in 1969
Bihar Assembly Election Results in 1972
Bihar Assembly Election Results in 1977
Bihar Assembly Election Results in 1980
Bihar Assembly Election Results in 1985
Bihar Assembly Election Results in 1990
Bihar Assembly Election Results in 1995
Bihar Assembly Election Results in 2000
Bihar Assembly Election Results in 2005
Bihar Assembly Election Results in 2010

References

External links
 

Politics of Nalanda district
Assembly constituencies of Bihar